Seymour Etienne Bottex (24 December 1922 - 16 May 2016) was a Haitian painter. Born in Port-Margot, in northern Haiti, Bottex worked as a photographer until 1955 when his older brother Jean-Baptiste encouraged him to begin painting. He joined the Centre d'Art and later the Galerie Issa in Port-au-Prince. His paintings, mingling humorous, historical, and biblical themes, are exhibited worldwide and auctioned at Sotheby's in New York. He is considered one of the finest Haitian naïf painters, and his murals in the Episcopal Cathedral de Sainte Trinité in Port-au-Prince are considered the most important achievement in Haitian modern art.

Paintings by Seymour Etienne Bottex have been sold by the Friends of HAS Haiti to raise funds for the Hôpital Albert Schweitzer Haiti, located in Deschapelles.

External links
  Paintings by Seymour Etienne Bottex at Friends of Hôpital Albert Schweitzer
According to an invitation to benefit Eye Care from the Embassy of Haiti issued Sunday Oct 16, 1994, "Seymour Etienne Bottex was born in 1920 near Cap-Haïtien. Bottex began painting in 1955 and was encouraged to paint by his brother, Jean-Baptiste, already a well-known artist.

Bottex scenes are often colorful. Humorous themes are sometimes represented in his work.  His paintings have been exhibited in the United States, England, France and Italy..."

References
 

1922 births
Haitian painters
Haitian male painters
2016 deaths
People from Nord (Haitian department)